Willy Ascherl (7 January 1902 – 8 August 1929) was a German international footballer.

References

1902 births
1929 deaths
Association football forwards
German footballers
Germany international footballers
Sportspeople from Fürth
Footballers from Bavaria
20th-century German people